My Destiny is a 2014 Philippine television drama romance series broadcast by GMA Network. Directed by Joyce E. Bernal, it stars Carla Abellana, Tom Rodriguez and Rhian Ramos. It premiered on June 30, 2014, on the network's Telebabad line up replacing Kambal Sirena. The series concluded on October 17, 2014, with a total of 80 episodes. It was replaced by Hiram na Alaala in its timeslot.

The series is streaming online on YouTube.

Premise
Grace, a family woman meets Matthew and they become both attracted to each other. While Grace's sister Joy who suffers from leukemia falls in love with Lucas, who is Grace's Matthew.

Cast and characters

Lead cast
 Carla Abellana as Grace Dela Rosa-Andrada
 Tom Rodriguez as Lucas Matthew Andrada
 Rhian Ramos as Joy Dela Rosa

Supporting cast
 Lorna Tolentino as Agnes Dela Rosa
 Sid Lucero as Jacob Perez
 Kuh Ledesma as Selena Andrada
 Al Tantay as Arnold Dela Rosa
 Ayen Munji-Laurel as Ruth Perez
 Dennis Roldan as Mateo Andrada
 Ruru Madrid as Paul Andrada
 Ash Ortega as Alex Martinez
 Gabrielle Garcia as Nicole Perez

Recurring cast
 Cai Cortez as Let-let
 Marc Acueza as Felix

Guest cast
 Veyda Inoval as young Joy
 Angel Aviles as young Grace
 Timothy Chan as young Matthew
 Lolli Mara as Rebecca Dela Rosa
 Pauleen Luna as Janine
 Tessie Tomas as Obispo
 Melissa Mendez as Mrs. Arcilla
 Sabrina Man as Michelle
 Ervic Vijandre as Rocky
 Chariz Solomon as Dang
 Marnie Lapuz as Ching
 Vince Velasco as Drake
 Arianne Bautista as Anabelle
 Rolly Innocencio as Manny
 Lou Sison as Erica
 Nanette Inventor as Leonora Banal
 Prince Chromewell Cosio as James
 Alessandra de Rossi as Sandy
 James Wright as a wedding singer

Ratings
According to AGB Nielsen Philippines' Mega Manila household television ratings, the pilot episode of My Destiny earned a 22.7% rating. While the final episode scored a 27.3% rating. The series had its highest rating on August 28, 2014, with a 27.8 rating.

Accolades

References

External links
 
 

2014 Philippine television series debuts
2014 Philippine television series endings
Filipino-language television shows
GMA Network drama series
Philippine romance television series
Television shows set in Manila
Television shows set in Singapore